The Tour was a co-headlining summer tour between American hard rock and heavy metal bands Kiss and Mötley Crüe. The tour, described as "Elvis on steroids" by Paul Stanley, was announced on March 20 and started on July 20, 2012 in Bristow, Virginia. At first, 40 dates were announced while the August 5 concert at AT&T Center and the August 1 concert at KFC Yum! Center were subsequently added. "The Tour" was listed by the Rolling Stone as one of "The Ten Hottest Summer Package Tours of 2012". The Treatment was the opening act for all shows.

In the tour program for Kiss' final tour, Singer reflected on the tour:

Setlists

Mötley Crüe

"Saints of Los Angeles"
"Wild Side"
"Shout at the Devil"
"Same Ol' Situation (S.O.S.)"
"Sex"
"Don't Go Away Mad (Just Go Away)"
"Home Sweet Home" (Tommy Lee's drum solo)
"Live Wire" (Mick Mars guitar solo)
"Primal Scream"
"Dr. Feelgood"
"Girls, Girls, Girls"
"Kickstart My Heart"

"Looks That Kill" was played until July 22.

Kiss

Main Set
"Detroit Rock City"
"Shout It Out Loud"
"I Love It Loud"
"Firehouse" (Gene breathes fire)
"Hell or Hallelujah"
"War Machine"
"Shock Me" (Tommy and Eric Jam)
"God of Thunder" (Gene spits blood)
"Love Gun" (Paul flies to b stage)
"Lick It Up"
"Black Diamond"

Encore
"I Was Made For Lovin' You" (played in Mexico City)
 Random Song
"Rock and Roll All Nite"

Setlist 2
"Detroit Rock City"
"Shout It Out Loud"
"I Love It Loud"
"Firehouse" (Gene breathes fire)
"Love Gun" (Paul flies to b stage)
"War Machine"
"Shock Me" (Tommy and Eric Jam)
"Hell or Hallelujah"
"God of Thunder" (Gene spits blood)
"Lick It Up"
"Black Diamond"

Encore
"Rock and Roll All Nite"

Random Songs
"Deuce"
"Calling Dr. Love"
"Cold Gin"
"C'mon and Love Me"
"Hotter Than Hell"
"Strutter"
"Got to Choose"
"Do You Love Me?"
"Crazy Crazy Nights"
"Makin' Love"

Tour dates

Personnel

Kiss
Paul Stanley – vocals, rhythm guitar
Gene Simmons – vocals, bass
Tommy Thayer – lead guitar, vocals
Eric Singer – drums, vocals

Mötley Crüe
Vince Neil – lead vocals
Mick Mars – guitar, backing vocals
Nikki Sixx – bass, backing vocals
Tommy Lee – drums, backing vocals

References

Kiss (band) concert tours
Mötley Crüe concert tours
2012 concert tours
2013 concert tours
Co-headlining concert tours